Metamoris was a Brazilian jiu-jitsu promotion, founded by Ralek Gracie, and executive producer Eddie Marquez that organized events in Los Angeles, California. Live events of Metamoris were broadcast via internet pay-per-view around the world and via premium TV at Canal Combate in Brazil.

Rules
The athletes compete in 20 minute, submission-only, gi or no-gi matches. There are no points given and if there is no submission, a draw is declared.

Metamoris I 
Metamoris I was held 2012-10-14.
#1:  Caio Terra vs.  Jeff Glover
 Terra defeated Glover via submission (armbar) (13:27)
#2:  Rafael Lovato Jr. vs.  Kayron Gracie
 Lovato defeated Gracie via submission (kimura) (11:16)
#3:  Kron Gracie vs.  Otavio Sousa
 Gracie defeated Sousa via submission (armbar) (17:00)
#4:  Alexandre Ribeiro vs.  Dean Lister
 Ribeiro and Lister fought to a draw (20:00)
#5:  André Galvão vs.  Ryron Gracie
 Galvão and Gracie fought to a draw (20:00)
#6:  Roger Gracie vs.  Marcus Almeida
 Gracie and Almeida fought to a draw (20:00)

Metamoris II 
Metamoris II was held 2013-06-09.
#1:  Jonathan Torres vs.  Victor Estima
 Torres and Estima fought to a draw (20:00)
#2:  Mackenzie Dern vs.  Michelle Nicolini
 Dern and Nicolini fought to a draw (20:00)
#3:  Roberto Abreu vs.  Brendan Schaub
 Abreu and Schaub fought to a draw (20:00)
#4:  André Galvão vs.  Rafael Lovato Jr.
 Galvão defeated Lovato via decision (20:00)
#5:  Rodolfo Vieira vs.  Braulio Estima
 Vieira defeated Estima via decision (20:00)
#6:  Kron Gracie vs.  Shinya Aoki
 Gracie defeated Aoki via submission (guillotine choke) (6:50)

Metamoris III   
Metamoris III was held 2014-03-29. Executive Producer Ralek Gracie & Eddie Marquez
#1:  Zak Maxwell vs.  Sean Roberts
 Maxwell and Roberts fought to a draw (20:00)
#2:  Guilherme Mendes vs.  Samir Chantre
 Mendes defeated Chantre via submission (baseball bat choke) (6:19)
#3:  Dean Lister vs.  Renato Sobral
 Lister and Sobral fought to a draw (20:00)
#4:  Keenan Cornelius vs.  Kevin Casey
 Cornelius defeated Casey via submission (heel hook) (12:53)
#5:  Rafael Mendes vs.  Clark Gracie
 Mendes and Gracie fought to a draw (20:00)
#6:  Eddie Bravo vs.  Royler Gracie
 Bravo and Gracie fought to a draw (20:00)

Metamoris IV 
Metamoris IV was held 2014-08-09.
#1:  Garry Tonon vs.  Kit Dale
 Tonon defeated Dale via submission (guillotine choke) (3:20)
#2:  Saulo Ribeiro vs.  Rodrigo Medeiros
 Ribeiro and Medeiros fought to a draw (20:00)
#3:  Keenan Cornelius vs.  Vinny Magalhães
 Cornelius and Magalhães fought to a draw (20:00)
#4 (secret match):  Baret Yoshida vs.   Jeff Glover
 Yoshida and Glover fought to a draw (20:00)
#5:  Dean Lister vs.  Josh Barnett
 Barnett defeated Lister via submission (chest compressor) (19:48)
#6:  André Galvão vs.  Chael Sonnen
 Galvão defeated Sonnen via submission (rear naked choke) (13:49)

Metamoris V  
Metamoris V was held 2014-11-22.
#1:  Garry Tonon vs.  Zak Maxwell
 Tonon defeated Maxwell via submission (heel hook) (9:23)
#2:  Vinny Magalhães vs.  Matheus Diniz
  Magalhães and Diniz fought to a draw (20:00)
#3:  Yuri Simoes vs.   Keenan Cornelius
  Simoes and Cornelius fought to a draw (20:00)
#4 (secret match):  Jake Shields vs.   Roberto Satoshi
 Shields and Satoshi fought to a draw (20:00)
#5:  Rory MacDonald vs.  Jonathan Torres
 MacDonald and Torres fought to a draw (20:00)
#6:  Kazushi Sakuraba vs.  Renzo Gracie
 Sakuraba and Gracie fought to a draw (20:00)

Metamoris VI  
Metamoris VI was held 2015-05-09.
 #1:  Francisico Iturralde vs.  Greg McIntyre
Iturralde defeated McIntyre via straight armbar. (06:38)
 #2:  Michael Liera, Jr. vs. Morgan Neidlinger
Liera and Neidlinger fought to a draw. (20:00)
 #3:  Evandro Nunes vs.  Jimmy Friedrich
Nunes and Friedrich fought to a draw. (20:00)
 #4:  Clark Gracie vs.  Roberto Satoshi 
Gracie and Satoshi fought to a draw. (20:00)
 #5:  Alexandre Ribeiro vs.  Keenan Cornelius 
Ribeiro and Cornelius fought to a draw. (20:00)
 #6:  Dillon Danis vs.  Joe Lauzon
Danis defeated Lauzon via D'arce choke. (05:41)
 #7:  Chael Sonnen vs.  Renato Sobral
Sonnen and Sobral fought to a draw (20:00)
 #8: (Heavyweight Championship match):  Josh Barnett (c) vs.  Ryron Gracie
Barnett defeated Gracie via toehold. (12:58)

Metamoris VII 
Metamoris VII was held 2016-07-17.
#1:  Stephen Martinez vs.  Morgan Neidlinger
 Martinez and Neidlinger fought to a draw (20:00)
#2:  Fabio Leopoldo vs.  Eduardo Telles
 Leopoldo and Telles fought to a draw (20:00)
#3:  Satoshi Ishii vs.  Vladimir Matyushenko
 Ishii and Matyushenko fought to a draw (20:00)
#4:  Richie Martinez vs.   Kevin Casey
 Martinez and Casey fought to a draw (20:00)
#5:  Bruno Malfacine vs.  Jeff Glover
 Malfacine and Glover fought to a draw (20:00)
#6:  Ralek Gracie vs.  Garry Tonon
 Tonon defeated Gracie via Leglock (kneebar)

Metamoris VIII 
Metamoris VIII was held 2017-11-26. 
#1:  Gordon Ryan vs.  Ralek Gracie
Ryan defeated Gracie via Submission (reverse triangle)

#2:  Carlos Gomez vs.  Danny Stolfi

Stolfi defeated Gomez via Submission (Double Armbar/ Rubber guard)

Commentators

Rener Gracie (M1-M2, M6)
Ed O'Neill (M2)
Kenny Florian (M3-M5)
Jeff Glover (M3-M8)
Kit Dale (M5)
Bas Rutten (M6)
Mackenzie Dern (M7)

See also
 Polaris Pro Grappling
 ADCC Submission Wrestling World Championship

References

External links

Brazilian jiu-jitsu competitions